Yuri Dmitriyevich Myrza (born 9 July 1974) is a former Moldovan professional football player.

External links
 

1974 births
Living people
Moldovan footballers
Moldovan expatriate footballers
Expatriate footballers in Russia
Association football defenders
Moldovan Super Liga players
FC Taganrog players
FC Dynamo Vologda players
FC Spartak Nizhny Novgorod players